56 Arietis is a single, variable star in the northern zodiac constellation of Aries. It has the variable star designation SX Arietis, while 56 Arietis is the Flamsteed designation. This object is visible to the naked eye as a faint, blue-white hued point of light with a baseline apparent visual magnitude of 5.79.

This is a magnetic, chemically peculiar star of the silicon type with a stellar classification of B9pSi, and it has a rapid rotation period of 17.5 hours. This period is increasing by about two seconds every hundred years. The star displays evidence of a five year period for procession of its axis. 56 Arietis is the prototype of a class of variable stars known as SX Arietis variables, which are rotationally variable stars with strong magnetic fields. It ranges in brightness from 5.75 down to 5.81 with a cyclical period matching its rotation rate.

References

External links
 HR 954
 Image 56 Arietis

Ap stars
SX Arietis variables
Aries (constellation)
BD+26 0523
Arietis, 56
019832
014893
0954
Arietis, SX